Advice from the Happy Hippopotamus is an album by American music group Cloud Cult, released in June 2005 by Earthology Records.

The song "Lucky Today" was used in an advertising campaign for Esurance that showed the band performing the song while sitting on clouds.

Track listing
All songs written by Craig Minowa.
"Intro" – 3:03
"Living on the Outside of Your Skin" – 3:06
"Happy Hippo" – 2:40
"What Comes at the End" – 3:57
"You Got Your Bones to Make a Beat" – 3:01
Untitled – 0:26
"Washed Your Car" – 1:59
"Transistor Radio" – 4:08
"What It Feels Like to Be Alive" – 0:51
"Moving to Canada" – 3:06
"Start New" – 1:43
"Car Crash" – 2:55
"Light at the End of the Tunnel" 2:45
"Million Things" – 2:36
"Can't Stop the Journey Now" – 3:24
"Clip-Clop" – 2:30
"Training Wheels" – 4:04
"We Made Up Your Mind for You" – 2:23
"That Man Jumped Out the Window" – 3:46
Untitled – 0:31
"Lucky Today" – 2:10
Untitled – 1:04
"Rockwell" – 4:20
Untitled – 0:31
"Bobby's Spacesuit" – 3:02

References

External links
Advice from the Happy Hippopotamus page at CloudCult.com

2005 albums
Cloud Cult albums